Special Herbs: The Box Set Vol. 0–9 is a box set by Metal Fingers, released on January 24, 2006. As the last release under the Special Herbs project, the box set was limited to 7,500 copies during its initial release. It was reissued in August 2012, this time with minor artwork changes and all the beats in their original form.

The limited edition box set consists of 3 CDs. Discs 1 and 2 are mixed extracts from the initial ten volumes of the Special Herbs series. Disc 3 is a collection of KMD instrumentals.

Track listing
Disc 1

Disc 2

Disc 3
 Who Me? - 3:36
 Plumskinzz - 4:51
 Humrush - 3:26
 Garbage Day #3 - 3:32
 Constipated Monkey - 2:56
 Contact Blitt - 2:34
 What a Nigga Know? - 3:34
 Get-U-Now - 5:12
 Smokin' That Shit! - 4:39
 It Sounded Like a Roc! - 4:50

References

MF Doom albums
Instrumental hip hop albums
2006 compilation albums
Nature Sounds compilation albums
Instrumental albums